Anick is a village and former civil parish, now in the parish of Sandhoe, in Northumberland, England, situated to the north of Hexham. In 1881 the parish had a population of 153.

Anick, pronounced , should not be confused with Alnwick, pronounced ; a much larger town also in Northumberland, but some  further north.

Governance 
Anick was formerly a township in St. John Lee parish, from 1866 Anick was a civil parish in its own right until it was abolished on 24 March 1887 and merged with Sandhoe.

References 

Villages in Northumberland
Former civil parishes in Northumberland